Wijaya or Widjaja, an Indonesian word meaning "victory", may refer to:

People

Angelique Widjaja (born 1984), Indonesian tennis player 
Candra Wijaya (born 1975), Chinese-Indonesian badminton player
Chelsea Olivia Wijaya (born 1992), Indonesian actress and pop singer
Eka Tjipta Widjaja (born 1922), Indonesian entrepreneur
Elizabeth A. Widjaja (born 1951), Indonesian botanist
Hendry Wijaya (born 1974), Indonesian pianist
I Made Andhika Wijaya (born 1996), Indonesian footballer
Indra Wijaya Ibrahim, Singaporean drug addict and killer
I Made Pasek Wijaya (born 1969), Indonesian footballer
Mieke Wijaya (born 1940), Indonesian actress
Nani Widjaja (Nani Wijaya, born 1944), Indonesian actress
Putu Wijaya (born 1944), Indonesian writer
Raden Wijaya (fl. 1292–1309), Javanese king

Other
Wijaya FC, a Brunei football club
Microgomphus wijaya, a dragonfly of family Gomphidae
Kartika Wijaya, a hotel in Batu, East Java, Indonesia
Jaya Wijaya, an alternate name for Puncak Jaya, a mountain in Papua Province, Indonesia
Operation Jayawijaya, an Indonesian military operation during Operation Trikora

See also 
 Vijaya (disambiguation)

Indonesian-language surnames